Veguillas can refer to:

The name of several places in Spain:

 Veguillas de la Sierra, a town in the province of Teruel, Aragon
 Las Veguillas, a town in the province of Salamanca, Castile-León
 Veguillas, minor local entity in the municipality of Cogolludo, province of Guadalajara, Castile-La Mancha